Thomas McCullouch Fairbairn (April 19, 1840 – May 13, 1874) was an Ontario lawyer and political figure. He represented Peterborough West in the Legislative Assembly of Ontario from 1871 to 1874.

Fairbairn was born in Bowmanville in 1840, the son of a Scottish immigrant. He articled in law and was called to the bar in 1865. In 1864, Fairbairn married Elfrida Armour and then, in 1866, Jane Roger after Elfrida's death. He practiced law in Peterborough. He was elected to the Ontario legislature in 1871 and died in Jacksonville, Florida while still in office.

His son, John Morrice Roger Fairbairn, became chief engineer for the Canadian Pacific Railway.

External links 

The Canadian parliamentary companion, HJ Morgan (1874)
The Canadian parliamentary companion for 1875, HJ Morgan

1840 births
1874 deaths
Ontario Liberal Party MPPs